Strongylocoris is a genus of plant bugs belonging to the family Miridae.

Species
Strongylocoris atrocoeruleus  (Fieber, 1864) 
Strongylocoris cicadifrons  A. Costa, 1853 
Strongylocoris erythroleptus  A. Costa, 1852 
Strongylocoris franzi  Wagner, 1955 
Strongylocoris leucocephalus  (Linnaeus, 1758) 
Strongylocoris luridus  (Fallén, 1807) 
Strongylocoris niger  (Herrich-Schaeffer, 1835) 
Strongylocoris oberthuri  Reuter, 1905 
Strongylocoris obscurus  (Rambur, 1839) 
Strongylocoris raimondoi  Carapezza, 1991 
Strongylocoris seabrai  Schmidt, 1939 
Strongylocoris steganoides  (J. Sahlberg, 1875)

References

Miridae genera